Mnestia is a genus of gastropods belonging to the family Mnestiidae.

The genus has almost cosmopolitan distribution.

Species:

Mnestia alboguttata 
Mnestia arachis 
Mnestia colorata 
Mnestia girardi 
Mnestia japonica 
Mnestia marmorata 
Mnestia meyeri 
Mnestia pulchra 
Mnestia villica

References

Gastropods